Elliot G. Jaspin (born May 27, 1946) is a Pulitzer Prize-winning American journalist.

Jaspin graduated from Baldwin Senior High School in 1964 and Colby College in 1969.

While writing for the Pottsville, Pennsylvania Republican & Herald, he won the 1979 Pulitzer Prize for Investigative Reporting with Gilbert M. Gaul for stories on the destruction of the Blue Coal Company by men with ties to organized crime.

In the same year, Jaspin won a Scripps Howard Foundation Edward J. Meeman Award and an American Bar Association Silver Gavel Award.

Published works

References

1946 births
Living people
Colby College alumni
Journalists from New York (state)
Journalists from Pennsylvania
People from Mineola, New York
Pulitzer Prize for Investigative Reporting winners
People from Baldwin, Nassau County, New York